Erin Dobratz (born October 19, 1982 in Concord, California) is a retired American synchronized swimmer. She shared a silver medal in the combination routine, and captured a bronze for the Americans in the team event at the 2003 FINA World Championships in Barcelona, Spain. On that same year, Dobratz added a gold to her career hardware in the same tournament at the Pan American Games in Santo Domingo, Dominican Republic. At the 2004 Summer Olympics, Dobratz helped the Team USA reclaim its spot to the medal podium with a bronze medal in the women's team event. Dobratz is also a graduate of Clayton Valley High School in Concord, California, and a member of the Stanford Cardinal women's synchronized swimming team.

Dobratz qualified for the women's team routine, as a member of the American squad, at the 2004 Summer Olympics in Athens. Dobratz helped the Americans score a third-place technical merit of 48.584 points, and went on to capture the bronze medal for her squad with a free routine of 48.834 to accumulate a total score of 97.418.

References

External links
Player Bio – Stanford Cardinal

1982 births
Living people
American synchronized swimmers
Olympic bronze medalists for the United States in synchronized swimming
Synchronized swimmers at the 2004 Summer Olympics
Medalists at the 2004 Summer Olympics
People from Concord, California
Stanford Cardinal women's swimmers
World Aquatics Championships medalists in synchronised swimming
Pan American Games gold medalists for the United States
Pan American Games medalists in synchronized swimming
Synchronized swimmers at the 2003 Pan American Games
Medalists at the 2003 Pan American Games